Paul Goodman (1934–1995) was a historian of American and Jewish history, and professor emeritus at the University of California, Davis.

Works 

 The Democratic-Republicans of Massachusetts (1965)
 Essays in American Colonial History (1968)
 The American Constitution (1972)
 Towards a Christian Republic: Antimasonry and the Great Transition in New England, 1826–1836 (1988)
 Of One Blood: Abolitionism and the Origins of Racial Equality (1998)

References

External links 

 Full texts of works by Paul Goodman in the Internet Archive

1934 births
1995 deaths
Cornell University alumni
Harvard University alumni
University of California, Davis faculty
Historians of the United States
Historians of Jews and Judaism
20th-century American historians